Thubana isocrypta is a moth in the family Lecithoceridae. It was described by Edward Meyrick in 1911. It is found in Sri Lanka.

The wingspan is about 15 mm. The forewings are rather dark fuscous. The second discal stigma is obscurely darker and there is a cloudy fuscous-whitish dot on the costa at three-fourths, where a very faintly indicated very obtusely angulated pale line runs to the dorsum before the tornus. The hindwings are grey.

References

Moths described in 1911
Thubana
Taxa named by Edward Meyrick